Charles Henry Smith, III (born December 21, 1969) is a former American football player and current outside linebacker coach for the Baltimore Ravens of the National Football League (NFL).  He played college football at the University of Tennessee and professionally in the National Football League (NFL) with the Atlanta Falcons from 1992 to 1999 and the Carolina Panthers in 2000.  Smith spent the 2010 season as an assistant coach as his alma mater, Tennessee.  He also has worked as a radio host in Atlanta.

High school and college years
Smith attended Clarke Central High School in Athens, Georgia, While playing two years in the NJCAA at Northeastern Oklahoma A&M, scouts took notice of Smith's natural athletic ability, which earned him a full scholarship to the University of Tennessee. While at Tennessee, Smith played in both the Sugar and the Fiesta Bowl and earned Most Valuable Player honors at the Senior Bowl.

Professional playing career

Smith was selected in the second round of the 1992 NFL Draft by the Atlanta Falcons. For eight seasons in Atlanta, from 1992 to 1999, Smith established himself as an All-Pro defensive end and led the Falcons to Super Bowl XXXIII. In 2000, Smith left Atlanta to join the Carolina Panthers. He ended his career there after one season following multiple surgeries on his right knee.

NFL career statistics

Life after playing career
Smith worked as a radio host with WVEE (V-103) in Atlanta. Smith also works as a personal trainer for other football players. He has two sons, Chuck the 4th, and Maddox. Also one daughter, Giovani. He weighs  less than he did during his football career and has spoken out about the health risks associated with the increasing size of football players.

On February 5, 2010, Smith accepted a position as defensive line coach at his alma mater, the University of Tennessee.  Smith left the Tennessee Volunteers coaching staff after a mutual decision with head coach Derek Dooley on February 6, 2011.

He resumed his coaching career when he joined the Baltimore Ravens as an outside linebacker coach for the 2023 NFL season.

References

External links
 

1969 births
Living people
American football defensive ends
American radio personalities
Atlanta Falcons players
Carolina Panthers players
Northeastern Oklahoma A&M Golden Norsemen football players
Tennessee Volunteers football coaches
Tennessee Volunteers football players
Sportspeople from Athens, Georgia
Players of American football from Atlanta
Baltimore Ravens coaches